Hrachik Javakhyan (born on July 6, 1984 in Vanadzor, Armenian SSR) is an Armenian boxer best known to win gold at the 2010 European Amateur Boxing Championships and bronze at the 2008 Summer Olympics. He was awarded the Honored Master of Sports of Armenia title in 2009.

Career
Javakhyan began boxing at the age of 14 under honored coach of Armenia, Gevorg Misakyan. Since 2005, he has been a member of the national team of Armenia.

Javakhyan advanced all the wy to the finals at the 2006 European Amateur Boxing Championships where he met reigning Olympic and World Champion Aleksei Tishchenko. Hrachik was defeated and won the silver medal.

The following year, Javakhyan qualified for the 2008 Summer Olympics by reaching the quarterfinals at the 2007 World Amateur Boxing Championships.

In 2008, at the Olympic Games, Javakhyan received a first round bye, defeated Rasheed Lawal in the second round without losing a point and had a walkover against Jong Sub-Baik. In the semifinals, Javakhyan faced Tishchenko again. Although he put up a better challenge than before, Javakhyan ultimately lost. Javakhyan was awarded an Olympic bronze medal, the first Olympic medal ever won by a boxer from the independent Armenia.

Javakhyan won a gold medal at the 2010 European Amateur Boxing Championships.

Olympic Games Results
2008
1st round bye
Defeated Rasheed Lawal (Nigeria) 12-0
Defeated Jong Sub-Baik (South Korea) WO
Lost to Aleksei Tishchenko (Russia) 5-10

World Amateur Championships Results
2005
Lost to Ibrahim Kamal (Canada) 18-29

2007
Defeated Aivars Romanovskis (Latvia) 17-14
Defeated Sadam Ali (United States) 20-16
Defeated Genebert Basadre (Philippines) 17-6
Lost to Domenico Valentino (Italy) 12-27

2009
Defeated Aivars Romanovskis (Bulgaria) 11-1
Lost to Éverton Lopes (Brazil) 3-10

2011
Defeated David Mueller (Germany) 17-11
Lost to Zdeněk Chládek (Czech Republic) 6-10

European Championships Results
2006
Defeated Ovidiu Bobirnat (Cyprus) 34-17
Defeated Krzysztof Szot (Poland) 20-10
Defeated Vazgen Safaryants (Belarus) 25-16
Lost to Aleksei Tishchenko (Russia) 15-39

2010
Defeated Alex Vasiljev (Finland) 11-2
Defeated Georgian Popescu (Romania) 9-3
Defeated David Mueller (Germany) 5-3
Defeated Olexandr Klyuchko (Ukraine) 5-1
Defeated Gyula Kate (Hungary) 3-2

References

External links
 Javakhyan's biography
 
 2006 Euro
 World 2007
 2010 Euro

1984 births
Living people
People from Vanadzor
Lightweight boxers
Light-welterweight boxers
Olympic boxers of Armenia
Boxers at the 2008 Summer Olympics
Olympic bronze medalists for Armenia
Olympic medalists in boxing
Medalists at the 2008 Summer Olympics
Armenian male boxers